On July 3, 2021, a standoff occurred between individuals, some of whom are alleged to be members of a militia group called Rise of the Moors, some of whom were armed, and state and local police officers on Interstate 95 in Wakefield, Massachusetts. This incident began when an officer with the Massachusetts State Police responded to stopped vehicles and allegedly found several in the group carrying long guns, side-arms, and wearing body armor. Police said the group claimed to be traveling from Rhode Island to Maine for training on privately owned land. The standoff lasted several hours and resulted in eleven arrests, ten of whom are adults and one child.

Background
Rise of the Moors is a New England group whose members identify as Moorish Americans. An Instagram account connected to the group says its goal is to continue the work of Noble Drew Ali, founder of the Moorish Science Temple of America. According to The Washington Post, the group is part of the Moorish sovereign-citizen movement, who claim immunity from local, state and federal laws. Similarly, the Southern Poverty Law Center classifies the Rise of the Moors as an "anti-government group" and identifies the Moorish sovereign-citizen movement with the broader sovereign-citizen movement.

Aftermath
About two weeks after the standoff, some of those arrested filed a $70,000,000 civil rights and defamation lawsuit against media outlets, the Massachusetts State Police, some individual troopers involved in the standoff, the presiding arraignment judge, and the Commonwealth of Massachusetts for "violating the claimants civil, national and human rights." The suit was dismissed as it would involve federal intervention in state court proceedings and that the allegations did not demonstrate any defamation.

At arraignment, all of the adults arrested and charged entered pleas of "not guilty." Several of the adults had changed their names to Moorish Science inspired names. The case is pending in Middlesex Superior Court. Many of the individuals are representing themselves. At least one of the defendants has a privately retained lawyer. As of mid-October 2022 all of the defendants have been released from pretrial detention.

References 

2021 in Massachusetts
Armed standoffs in the United States
Crimes in Massachusetts
July 2021 crimes in the United States
Incidents involving the sovereign citizen movement
Wakefield, Massachusetts